, sometimes credited as Eikō Toriumi, was a Japanese animation director, storyboardist, screenwriter, and novelist. 
He is best known for directing the TV show Science Ninja Team Gatchaman and also credited for his contributions to several other anime series.
He is known to Japanese fans for his TV series The Wonderful Adventures of Nils and Shima Shima Tora no Shimajirō and to international fans for his work in Area 88, Dallos, The Mysterious Cities of Gold, and Tekkaman: The Space Knight.

Toriumi's direction is very smart, dramatic, and complete. 
Mamoru Oshii was strongly influenced by him, and Oshii professes him to be "my mentor."
He always dealt with family as a theme in his work, and the relationship between father and son was especially important to him. On the other hand, he had no interested in dramas between men and women.

Toriumi also authored nearly two dozen novels. In addition to anime novelizations, he wrote mainly historically-themed novels based on Otogi-zōshi and Yomihon set in Japan from ancient times to the Middle Ages.
His representative work is the Kyūkei no Figurido series, which depicts the adventures and revenge of a man of Murakami Suigun who becomes a battle slave in Europe, where he arrives due to the betrayal of his comrades, set in England and France during the Hundred Years' War and in Japan during the Northern and Southern Courts.

Biography
Toriumi was born in Isehara, Kanagawa Pref., Japan, and graduated from the Department of Political Science, Faculty of Law, Chuo University.
After attending a screenwriting institute while in college with an interest in filmmaking, he joined Tatsunoko Productions in 1966.

Toriumi was selected as the series director for the TV series Science Ninja Team Gatchaman in 1972, and went on to direct other Tatsunoko TV series in the 1970s including Tekkaman: The Space Knight and Hurricane Polymar.
He was then asked to direct a sequel to "Gatchaman," but he did not accept because the story was already complete in his mind and he had nothing further to do.

In December 1978, Toriumi left Tatsunoko.
Shocked by the death of the first president, Tatsuo Yoshida, and concerned about his own future at Tatsunoko, he decided to become a freelancer and take on work for other studios.
After working at Sunrise, he joined Yuji Nunokawa, who had quit Tatsunoko earlier, and became one of the founding members of Studio Pierrot.
There, he worked on series such as The Wonderful Adventures of Nils and The Mysterious Cities of Gold. 
In The Wonderful Adventures of Nils, Mamoru Oshii, who transferred from Tatsunoko to Pierrot after apply to be his apprentice, also participated as one of the episode directors.
However, in the following The Mysterious Cities of Gold, Oshii, who was scheduled to be an assistant director, was approached by President Nunokawa to direct Urusei Yatsura, and, prepared to be excommunicated, accepted the offer without telling Toriumi and dropped out.

Toriumi worked with his protégé, director Mamoru Oshii, on 1983's Dallos, the first original video animation (OVA) ever released. 

Later, he left Studio Pierrot and became a freelancer again.

In 1990, he served as general director for the TV movie "Like the Clouds, Like the Wind," which featured character designer and animation director Katsuya Kondō and many other elite Studio Ghibli staff at the time.

After leaving Tatsunoko, he became a prolific novelist from the 1980s onward.

He died of heart failure on January 23, 2009, at the age of 67.

Filmography

Notes

References

External links
Yomiuri Online 
 

1941 births
2009 deaths
Anime directors
Anime screenwriters
Japanese animators
Japanese animated film directors
Japanese animated film producers
20th-century Japanese novelists
People from Tokyo
People from Kanagawa Prefecture
Tatsunoko Production people
Sunrise (company) people
Pierrot (company)
20th-century Japanese screenwriters